The Lockheed L-1011 TriStar, also known as the L-1011 (pronounced "El-ten-eleven") and TriStar, is an American medium-to-long-range, wide-body trijet airliner built by the Lockheed Corporation. It was the third wide-body airliner to enter commercial operations, after the Boeing 747 and the McDonnell Douglas DC-10. Its trijet configuration has three Rolls-Royce RB211 engines with one engine under each wing, along with a third engine center-mounted with an S-duct air inlet embedded in the tail and the upper fuselage. The aircraft has an autoland capability, an automated descent control system, and available lower deck galley and lounge facilities.

The L-1011 TriStar was produced in two fuselage lengths. The original L-1011-1 first flew in November 1970 and entered service with Eastern Air Lines in 1972. The shortened, longer range L-1011-500 first flew in 1978 and entered service with British Airways a year later. The original-length TriStar was also produced as the high gross weight L-1011-100, up-rated engine L-1011-200, and further upgraded L-1011-250. Post-production conversions for the L-1011-1 with increased takeoff weights included the L-1011-50 and L-1011-150.

The L-1011 TriStar's sales were hampered by two years of delays due to developmental and financial problems at Rolls-Royce, the sole manufacturer of the aircraft's engines. Between 1968 and 1984, Lockheed manufactured a total of 250 TriStars, assembled at the Lockheed plant located at the Palmdale Regional Airport in southern California north of Los Angeles. After L-1011 production ended, Lockheed withdrew from the commercial aircraft business due to its below-target sales.

Development

Origins
In the 1960s, American Airlines approached Lockheed and competitor Douglas (later McDonnell Douglas) with the need for an airliner which could carry 250 passengers on transcontinental routes. Lockheed had not produced civilian airliners since 1961 with the L-188 Electra. In the 1950s the Electra was designed for turboprop propulsion, which Lockheed had successfully used on the C-130 Hercules military transport. Even after the Electra overcame vibration problems that caused several crashes early in its career, the market for large airliners would soon shift over to jet airliners such as the Boeing 707 and Douglas DC-8. Lockheed won contracts for jet military transports with the C-141 StarLifter, and pioneered very large jet transports with the large C-5 Galaxy with its high-bypass turbofan engines. Boeing lost the military contract, but its private-venture 747 captured what would become a much larger civilian airliner market for wide-body airliners.

Having experienced difficulties with some of its military programs, Lockheed was eager to re-enter the civilian market with a smaller wide-body jet, and its response was the L-1011 TriStar. Douglas Aircraft answered American Airlines with the DC-10, which had a similar three-engine configuration and dimensions. Despite their similarities, the L-1011 and DC-10's engineering approach differed greatly. McDonnell, who had recently taken over Douglas Aircraft, directed DC-10 development on a "very firm budget, and cost overruns were unacceptable even at the expense of safety", and the conservative approach meant reusing Douglas DC-8 technology. By contrast, Lockheed would "take the most advanced technology of the day and when that technology was lacking, Lockheed created it" for the L-1011 in order to give it lower noise emissions, improved reliability, and higher efficiency over first-generation jet airliners. The TriStar name was selected in a Lockheed employee naming contest for the airliner. The advanced technology that went into the TriStar resulted in a high purchase price.

The TriStar's design featured a twin-aisle interior with a maximum of 400 passengers and a three-engine layout. The TriStar was originally conceived as a "jumbo twin", but a three-engine design was ultimately chosen to give the aircraft enough thrust to take off from existing runways. Also, before the establishment of Extended Operations standards by the FAA in the 1980s, commercial jets with only two engines were not allowed to fly more than 30 minutes away from an airport, making trans-oceanic flights impossible. The main visible difference between the TriStar and its similar trijet competitor, the McDonnell Douglas DC-10, is the central tail engine configuration: the DC-10's engine is mounted above the fuselage for simplicity of design and more economical construction, while the TriStar's engine is mounted to the rear fuselage and fed through an S-duct (similar to the Boeing 727) for reduced drag and improved stability. Lockheed engineers were able to maintain straight-through engine performance by limiting the curve of the S-duct to less than a quarter of the radius of the engine intake diameter. The S-duct design also reduced the total empty aircraft weight. The research undertaken during the design of the L-1011 indicated that losses of using an S-duct were more than compensated for by the above savings. A further major difference between the L-1011 and the DC-10 was Lockheed's selection of the Rolls-Royce RB211 as the only engine for the L-1011. As originally designed, the RB211 turbofan was an advanced three-spool design with a carbon fiber fan, which would have better efficiency and power-to-weight ratio than any competing engine like the General Electric CF6 that powered the DC-10. In theory, the triple spool would produce the same or more power as existing double spool engines while having a smaller cross section that would reduce drag.

American Airlines opted for the Douglas DC-10, although it showed considerable interest in the L-1011. American intended to convince Douglas to lower its price for the DC-10, which it did. Without the support of American, the TriStar was launched on orders from TWA and Eastern Air Lines.

Although the TriStar's design schedule closely followed that of its competitor, McDonnell Douglas beat Lockheed to market by a year due to delays in powerplant development. In February 1971, after massive development costs associated with the RB211, Rolls-Royce went into receivership. This halted L-1011 final assembly and Lockheed investigated the possibility of a US engine supplier. However the engineering was finalized at that stage in the TriStar's development and its S-duct, which was designed to fit the smaller cross-section of the triple spool RB-211 engine that would have reduced drag, was too small in diameter to accommodate an existing double spool engine. One option presented was potential outsource of RB-211 production to Canadian manufacturer Orenda Engines.

The British government agreed to approve a large state subsidy to restart Rolls-Royce operations on condition the U.S. government guarantee the bank loans Lockheed needed to complete the L-1011 project. Despite some opposition, not least from the then Governor of California, Ronald Reagan, the U.S. government provided these guarantees. For the rest of the RB211 project, Rolls-Royce remained a government-owned company.

Production

The TriStar's internal Lockheed model number is L-093. The TriStar was manufactured in Lockheed facilities in Burbank and Palmdale, California.

The prototype L1011 first flew on November 16, 1970. The crew for that flight was Henry B. "Hank" Dees (pilot), Ralph C. Cokely (copilot), and G.E. Fisher (development engineer). The L-1011 was certified on April 14, 1972, with the first airliner delivered to Eastern Air Lines on April 26, 1972. In 1972, its unit cost was US$20 million. To further publicize the new aircraft, an L-1011 was taken on a world tour during 1972 by famed Lockheed test pilot Tony LeVier. In a demonstration by test pilots LeVier and Charles Hall, 115 crew members, employees, and reporters embarked on the TriStar for a 4-hour, 13-minute flight from Palmdale to Dulles Airport "with the TriStar's AFCS [Automatic Flight Control System] feature engaged from takeoff roll to landing", and Lockheed touted it as "a groundbreaking moment: the first cross-country flight without the need for human hands on the controls".

Lockheed discovered fairly early on that the TriStar suffered from higher than estimated structural weight, engine weight, and specific fuel consumption. However, the weight problems affected the weight and desirability of early production L-1011-1 aircraft, known as Group 1 (serial numbers 1002 through to 1012).

These aircraft, in general, also have different center of gravity envelopes with the forward center of gravity limit on the early aircraft being more restrictive at higher gross weights. Groups 1 and 2 aircraft (serial numbers 1002 to 1051) are upgradeable only to -50 or -150 specifications, although the Group 1 aircraft (up to serial number 1012) still maintain their operating disadvantages. All L-1011-1 aircraft from serial number 1052 onwards are Group 3 aircraft and are fully upgradeable to all variants up to -250 specification.

Costs at Rolls-Royce were controlled and its efforts largely went into the original TriStar engines, which needed considerable modifications between the L-1011's first flight and service entry. The competition, notably General Electric, was very quick to develop its CF6 engine with more thrust, which meant that a heavier "intercontinental" DC-10-30 could be more quickly brought to market. The flexibility afforded to potential customers by a long-range DC-10 put the L-1011 at a serious disadvantage. Rolls-Royce went on to develop the high-thrust RB211-524 for the L-1011-200 and -500, but this took many years.

The resultant delay in Lockheed and Rolls-Royce offering a high gross variant with a longer range, coupled with the TriStar's delayed introduction, meant that only 250 TriStars were sold compared to some 400 DC-10s. Lockheed needed to sell 500 airliners to break even, but in 1981, the company announced production would end with the delivery of the 250th and last L-1011 on order in 1984.

The TriStar's failure to achieve profitability caused Lockheed to withdraw from the civilian aircraft business. The TriStar's rivalry with the DC-10 has been seen as a "case study in what can happen when two manufacturers attempt to split a market that simply could not support both aircraft". Lockheed lacked the resources to follow up with several proposals based on the TriStar wing and airframe, including a wide-body twinjet and a stretched quad-jet (one of the quadjet proposals consisting of two underwing engines and two rear fuselage-mounted engines). McDonnell Douglas was also financially weakened and could only develop the MD-11, a refinement of the DC-10, instead of an all-new design to challenge the next generation of twinjets like the Boeing 777.

Design

Engines 
The RB211 and its features, despite the delays in its development, provided the L-1011 with then-unmatched fuel economy and noise levels.

Reversers and nozzle 
During development the RB211 engines on the L-1011 had thrust-spoilers – target-type hot-stream reverse buckets – alongside the cold-bypass reversers. Despite capturing 25% of the total engine thrust, aerodynamic interference with the flaps diminished the braking effect of the flaps, so the thrust-spoilers were removed; instead an 11-degree afterbody was installed, which improved the specific range by 1.5%. Further improvements led to a 15-degree afterbody, enabling the L-1011 "to beat its predicted specific air range at 0.85 Mach by between 3.5 and 5.5 percent, the exact figure depending on cruise weight."

All-flying tail 
Instead of the trimmable horizontal stabilizer (THS) found on the jetliners of its day and through the 2010s, the L-1011 incorporated an all-flying tail – a stabilator. The aft portion had a geared (anti-servo) elevator that was linked to and moved with the stabilator, changing the stabilator's camber and improving the overall control surface effectiveness. Lockheed's main drive away from a THS was "[eliminating] mis-trim and runaway trim problems that have contributed to a number of accidents in the past." The fact that the elevators are not moved directly led to the failure in recognizing the jamming (trailing edge up) of the left elevator aboard Delta Air Lines Flight 1080 in 1977.

Fuel system 
The L-1011-1 has four wing tanks; each inboard tank feeds the respective wing engine, and the two outboard tanks feed the tail engine via a flow equalizer. The additional center tank of the long-range variants, which is two halves, is located between the wing halves. Each center tank half acts as additional capacity to its adjacent inboard wing tank; filling it by way of ejector pumps. When the center tank is filled, it is used to crossfeed all three engines in flight (by way of the ejector pumps and crossfeed valves) until the center tank is empty and the remaining tanks are equalized.

Landing gear 
The nose landing gear had two attachment points forward and aft, allowing a short-enough tug to push or pull the plane from directly underneath, a feature to allow operations where there wasn't enough forward space at some airports, which was more common at the time.

Electrical system and Avionics 
The L-1011 was the first jetliner to have an integrated drive generator (IDG).

The FMS on the L-1011, certified by the FAA in September 1977, offered many features that have since become common. The features were aimed at greatly reducing crew workload and improving fuel efficiency. Of those are a Mach/IAS cruise control, an automatic Rough Air Mode that detects turbulence and adjusts the engine power setting accordingly, and a descent mode that figures out the optimum location to start a descent by "back computing" from a preselected point, allowing "on-altitude and on-speed" arrival.

The L-1011 also featured a highly advanced autopilot system and was the first widebody to receive FAA certification for Cat-IIIc autolanding, which approved the TriStar for completely blind landings performed by the aircraft's autopilot in zero-visibility weather. The L-1011 used an inertial navigation system to navigate; this included aligning the navigation system by entering current coordinates of longitude and latitude.

It also had a unique direct lift control (DLC) system, which allowed for smooth approaches when landing, without having to use significant pitch changes while on the approach path. DLC helps maintain the aircraft on the glideslope during final approach by automatically deploying spoiler panels on the wings. Thus, rather than maintaining the descent by adjusting pitch, DLC helps control the descent while maintaining a more consistent pitch angle, using four redundant hydraulic systems. The production also used a unique "autoclave" system for bonding fuselage panels together; this made the L-1011 extremely resistant to corrosion.

Other components and systems 
The APU was capable of operating up to 30,000 feet; its two square-shaped inlet doors are situated on the bottom fuselage on the aircraft's centerline towards the rear of the plane.

Compared to the typical three-system of its era, the L-1011 had four independent 3,000-psi hydraulic systems, A through D.

Operational history

Commercial

TWA heralded the TriStar as one of the safest aircraft in the world in promotional literature in the 1980s when concern over the safety record of the McDonnell Douglas DC-10, flown by rival airlines, was at its peak. The L-1011 has been involved in five fatal accidents, only one of which was due to a problem with the aircraft.

Delta Air Lines was the type's largest customer. Delta retired its TriStars in 2001 to replace them with the Boeing 767-400ER.  Cathay Pacific eventually became the largest non-U.S. operator of the type by acquiring many of the Eastern Air Lines examples when Eastern went bankrupt, operating as many as 21 aircraft.  Cathay Pacific retired its L-1011s in October 1996 and replaced the type with the Airbus A330-300. TWA withdrew its last TriStar from service in 1997.

To secure the Japanese market, Lockheed secretly bribed several members of the Japanese government to subsidize All Nippon Airways' purchase of L-1011s; this caused a significant scandal when the bribes were uncovered. The discovered scale to what has become known as the Lockheed bribery scandal led to the arrest of Japanese Prime Minister Kakuei Tanaka, as well as several other officials. Within Lockheed, board chairman Daniel Haughton and vice chairman and president Carl Kotchian resigned their posts on February 13, 1976. Tanaka was eventually tried and found guilty of violating foreign exchange control laws but was not charged with bribery, a more serious criminal offense. Crucially for Lockheed, the fallout from the scandal included the loss of a contract worth over $1 billion.

The Soviet Union at that time lacked a widebody airliner. Development of its own Ilyushin Il-86 was delayed; consequently, in the mid-1970s, the Soviets started negotiations to buy 30 TriStars and license-produce up to 100 a year. The talks collapsed as US President Jimmy Carter made human rights an important consideration in US foreign policy. The TriStar was also listed by the Coordinating Committee as embodying advanced technology banned from potential enemies and thus a serious obstacle to the export deal.

The last three airlines to operate the L-1011 in scheduled service were Brussels Airlines (codeshare with Hewa Bora Airways), Thai Sky Airlines, and Lloyd Aereo Boliviano, with final flights in August 2007, February 2008, and May 2008, respectively. In later years the L-1011 has been used by smaller start-up carriers, particularly in Africa and Asia. These operators mainly do their business in the ad hoc charter and wet leasing businesses. ATA Airlines (formerly known as American Trans Air) fleet included over 19 TriStars, but operations dwindled to only three L-1011-500s before the company's shutdown in April 2008.

Military

The TriStar has also been used as a military tanker and passenger/cargo aircraft. The British Royal Air Force had nine aircraft of four variants. The aircraft were six ex-British Airways and three Pan Am L-1011-500s. All of the aircraft served with No. 216 Squadron, and were based at RAF Brize Norton. The TriStar was replaced in RAF service by the Airbus A330 MRTT under the Future Strategic Tanker Aircraft  program. 216 Squadron was officially disbanded on March 20, 2014, and flew its last sorties with the TriStar on March 24, 2014.

Other

In the early 1990s, Orbital Sciences began to use a converted L-1011-100 named Stargazer to launch Pegasus rockets into orbit around Earth. This venture effectively rendered the small Scout rocket obsolete. This aircraft was also used in support of the X-34 and X-43 programs. NASA performed aerodynamic research on Orbital Sciences' L-1011 in 1995. In 2014, three L-1011s in the world were airworthy. As of 2019, Stargazer is the only active L-1011.

Variants

The earlier versions of the L-1011, such as the -1, -100, and -150 can be distinguished from the later models by the design of the middle engine nacelles. The earlier version nacelle has a round intake, whereas the later models have a small vertical fin between the bottom of the middle engine intake and the top of the fuselage.

The two L-1011 aircraft delivered to Pacific Southwest Airlines were configured with internal airstair doors that led into an entry hall in what was normally the forward lower baggage hold. This was to allow operations from airfields that did not have terminal buildings with jet bridges. These two aircraft were later in service with Aeroperú and Worldways Canada.

L-1011-1

The L-1011-1 (FAA certification L-1011-385-1) was the first production model of the L-1011, designed for short- and medium-range flights. This variant served as the basis for subsequent variants. This type was purchased by Air Canada, ANA, Cathay Pacific, Eastern, and other operators with regional trunk routes requiring a widebody aircraft. Pacific Southwest Airlines purchased two L-1011-1 models with lower deck seating. This variant was also one of the few widebodies to have the option for a full-height built-in airstair.

The L-1011-1 was first delivered to Eastern Air Lines on April 5, 1972. A total of 160 L-1011-1 TriStars were built before production ended in 1983, although the majority of these, 119 or 75% of the total, were completed during a four-year period from 1972 to 1975. Most sales of the L-1011-1 were to US operators, with just three airlines, Delta, Eastern, and TWA, taking delivery of 110 combined. A further two aircraft were placed with a fourth US airline, Pacific Southwest Airlines.

L-1011-100

Launch orders for the L-1011-100 were placed by Saudia and Cathay Pacific, for two each, in May 1974. Deliveries began in June 1975.

The variant was also purchased by several airlines with longer-range routes, such as TWA, Air Canada, and BEA (which merged with BOAC to form British Airways). The first two L-1011-100s (serial numbers 1110 and 1116) were delivered new to Saudia with the same fuel capacity as the L-1011-1 (FAA certification L-1011-385-1-14); these were later upgraded to L-1011-200 specification.

L-1011-50
Fuel capacity was not increased. The -50 was available only as a conversion package for the L-1011-1 and was never built new.

L-1011-150
It was available only as a conversion for the L-1011-1. The first aircraft was converted by MBB at Lemwerder in Germany during the winter of 1988–89 and was subsequently handed over to Air Transat of Canada on May 11, 1989.

L-1011-200

The L-1011-200 (FAA certification L-1011-385-1-15), the third production model of the L-1011, was introduced in 1976. Although otherwise similar to the -100, the -200 uses Rolls-Royce RB.211-524B engines to improve its performance in hot and high-altitude conditions. Gulf Air used -200 models to replace its earlier-generation Vickers VC10 fleet.

Saudi Arabian Airlines (Saudia) was a launch customer for the -200 series and operated a sizable fleet until 1998. A total of 24 L-1011-200 aircraft were built new, with the first delivered to Saudia on May 28, 1977. Like other TriStar improvements, a conversion program has also been offered.

L-1011-250

The L-1011-250 was an upgrade developed for late-model L-1011-1 aircraft and all L-1011-100 and L-1011-200 aircraft. The more powerful engines, lengthened wing, active-load-control ailerons and other systems that had been developed for the L-1011-500 were adapted into the baseline model. This variant also used the upgraded RB211-524B4I engine, which could be easily retrofitted to the existing RB211-524B powerplants of the L-1011-200, but it required a re-engining on the L-1011-1 and L-1011-100, which used the original RB211-22B. The conversion allowed the L-1011 to match the performance of the long-range McDonnell Douglas DC-10-30. Although it could be applied to all L-1011 models, the upgrade was only undertaken by Delta on six late-model L-1011-1 aircraft.

L-1011-500

The L-1011-500 (FAA certification L-1011-385-3) was the last L-1011 variant to enter production. It was a longer-range variant first flight-tested in 1978. More powerful RB.211-524 engines, increased wingspan, active-load-control ailerons and other improved systems were features introduced by Lockheed to exploit newly available technologies in the late 1970s. The -500 variant was popular among international operators and formed a significant portion of the L-1011 fleet of Delta and British Airways. However, it entered service seven years after the similar DC-10-30 entered service, with that aircraft having already secured orders from potential L-1011-500 customers.

The TriStar 500 first flew on October 16, 1978, with the first delivery to British Airways on April 27, 1979. It entered service with British Airways on May 7, 1979, flying between London and Abu Dhabi. The last L-1011 produced was a TriStar 500, operated by the Las Vegas Sands.

Dimensions

Flying surfaces
Lockheed developed some aerodynamic improvements for the TriStar 500 which included a modified wing-to-body fairing, a fillet below the central intake, extended wingtips, and "active ailerons" or active control system (ACS). The new fairing reduced drag, while the fillet reduced noise in the rear cabin. The wingtip extensions increased aspect ratio, thus reducing induced drag, but resulted in increased bending. The ACS developed to solve this, provided gust alleviation, improving ride during flight, reduced fuel burn, and increased fatigue life.

Earlier TriStar 500s were delivered with the standard wing; these were later retrofitted with ailerons and extended wingtips. Pan Am was the first customer to order the -500 with the extended wingtips and active ailerons. Aircraft serial number 1176, the first for Pan Am, was the first TriStar 500 to be fitted with them as standard.

Powerplant

The TriStar 500 is equipped with the more powerful RB211-524B engines. Initially rated at  thrust each, the higher-thrust  -524B4 Improved (also referred to as the -524B4I) later became available, which also offered improved fuel efficiency.

Performance

Cabin
The TriStar 500's maximum passenger capacity is 315, although no aircraft were operated with that number of seats.  A typical two-class layout might include 21 First Class and 229 Economy Class for a maximum of 250 passengers. More spacious three-class layouts used on longer routes include 233 with 12 First Class, 32 Business Class, and 189 Economy Class with Delta Air Lines.  The aircraft is equipped with six exits, two fewer than the long-body TriStars, thus reducing the exit limit maximum.

Operators

One of the two L-1011 TriStars in service as of 2022 is the Stargazer air-launch mothership, operated by Northrop Grumman Space Systems (formerly Orbital Sciences Corporation).

Accidents and incidents

As of December 2011, the L-1011 was involved in 35 aviation occurrences, including 10 hull-losses, with 540 fatalities. Of the four pioneering widebody aircraft (Boeing 747, McDonnell Douglas DC-10, L-1011, and Airbus A300/A310 family), the Lockheed L-1011 had comparatively few accidents and a better safety record than its competitors.
 On December 29, 1972, Eastern Air Lines Flight 401, an L-1011, crashed in the Florida Everglades as a result of the flight crew's failure to monitor the flight instruments during a malfunction of the landing gear position indicator system. The crash resulted in 101 fatalities, and was the subject of two TV movies, Crash and The Ghost of Flight 401. It was also the subject of a Mayday episode.
 On April 12, 1977, Delta Air Lines Flight 1080, on takeoff from San Diego, had a left stabilizer jammed undetected in the full trailing-edge-up position. This failure resulted in a large noseup and rolling moment that almost exceeded the capability of the flight controls. The airplane was just about to stall in the clouds when Captain Jack McMahan, with unusual insight, reduced power on the wing engines and began using the throttles to supplement the remaining flight controls, using differential and collective engine thrust. Cabin crew moved all the passengers forward in the cabin to redistribute weight and help get the nose down. Steve Heidt, the flight engineer, said, "It probably didn't help much, but in that situation, we figured every little bit would help." All the way from San Diego to Los Angeles, the aircraft flew with its pitch controlled by differential thrust between tail and wing engines, while the left roll tendency was compensated by wing differential thrust, and made a successful emergency landing in Los Angeles. According to an incident analysis by Warren VanderBurgh, comprehensive crew training played a critical role in control recovery.
 On August 19, 1980, a fire destroyed the L-1011-200 used for Saudia Flight 163 on the ground after the pilots made an emergency landing at Riyadh's International Airport due to fire in the rear of the aircraft. Delays in initiating the evacuation of the aircraft led to the deaths of all 287 passengers and 14 crew.
 On December 23, 1980, Saudia Flight 162, an L-1011, had a tire explode and penetrate the passenger cabin. The aircraft lost cabin pressure and two passengers were ejected through a hole in the cabin floor. The aircraft was later repaired and returned to service.
The fragments from that engine damaged three of its four hydraulic systems resulting in fluid loss in them. The rudder pedals also jammed. The fragments struck but did not puncture the lines for the other hydraulic system; the captain was able to safely land the aircraft at John F. Kennedy International Airport, with some limited use of the outboard spoilers, the inboard ailerons and the horizontal stabilizer, plus differential engine power of the remaining two engines. There were no injuries. The L-1011 having four hydraulic systems (instead of three like the DC-10) allowed for a safe landing.
 On May 5, 1983, Eastern Air Lines Flight 855, L-1011 registration N334EA, while flying from Miami to Nassau, shut down the number 2 engine due to low oil pressure and began a return to Miami. Both of the remaining engines later failed. Without power, flight 855 descended from 13,000 to  before the number 2 engine was restarted and the aircraft landed in Miami without injuries. Incorrect engine maintenance had led to the loss of oil on all three engines.
 On April 5, 1984, a Saudia Lockheed L-1011 TriStar on final approach to Damascus from Jeddah was hijacked by a Syrian national. The hijacker demanded to be taken to Istanbul, Turkey, but changed his mind and requested to go to Stockholm. After landing in Istanbul to refuel, the pilot pushed the hijacker out the emergency exit whereupon he was arrested.

 On May 27, 1985, British Airtours Flight 101, registration G-BBAI, from Palma Airport, Mallorca, Spain overran the runway on landing at Leeds Bradford International Airport, West Yorkshire, United Kingdom. 12 of the 412 people on board suffered minor injuries when exiting down steep rear ramps. The aircraft was severely damaged.
 On August 2, 1985, Delta Air Lines Flight 191, an L-1011, crashed while approaching Dallas/Fort Worth International Airport in microburst conditions. The crash killed eight of 11 crew members and 128 of the 152 passengers on board, as well as one person on the ground.
 On October 18, 1985, a Jordanian Airlines L-1011 experienced an inflight fire at 24,000 feet while on approach to Singapore. The fire burned through the rear pressure bulkhead, causing explosive depressurization of the cabin. The air rushing out of the cabin extinguished the fire, saving the aircraft. All 118 passengers and crew survived. The aircraft was later repaired and placed back into service.
 On May 3, 1986, Air Lanka Flight 512 (now SriLankan Airlines), an L-1011, was destroyed on the ground in Colombo, Sri Lanka, after a bomb exploded in the rear cargo hold, severing the tail and killing 21 people.
 On June 28, 1991, LTU International L-1011 registration D-AERI, suffered an interior fire during maintenance in a hangar at Düsseldorf Airport. Four engineers escaped injury, but the aircraft was declared a total loss.
 On July 30, 1992, TWA Flight 843, an L-1011, had its takeoff aborted by the captain after liftoff from JFK, in response to a false stall warning. The aircraft landed too hard, breaking a wing spar and starting a fire. All 292 passengers and crew evacuated safely, with only 10 minor injuries. The airliner was destroyed by fire.
 On August 23, 1995, Delta Air Lines Flight 157, an L-1011 Tristar 1, suffered a rapid decompression after the pressure bulkhead failed. The flight crew initiated an emergency descent to 14,000 feet, and the plane landed safely at Los Angeles International Airport with no deaths or injuries to the 226 passengers or 10 crew. However, the aircraft was substantially damaged and later written off.

Aircraft on display

 N1011 L-1011-1 on display at the Delta Flight Museum in Atlanta, Georgia. This is the forward upper fuselage of the prototype aircraft and is painted in Delta colors.
 C-FTNA L-1011-1 on display at the Lyon–Saint-Exupéry Airport in Lyon, France.  After Air Transat flight TSC906 was damaged in a hailstorm, the plane returned to Lyon and was written off. It is still used today for emergency training.
 N31019 L-1011-50 on display at the National Airline History Museum in Kansas City, Missouri, at the Charles B. Wheeler Downtown Airport.
 TT-DWE L-1011-100 on display at the Emirates National Auto Museum in Abu Dhabi, United Arab Emirates. This aircraft was originally delivered to British Airways.
 HZ-AHP L-1011-200 in Saudia livery on display as a gate guardian at the Royal Saudi Air Force Museum in Riyadh, Saudi Arabia.
 9Y-TGN L-1011-500 on display at the Chaguaramas Military History and Aerospace Museum in Chaguaramas, Trinidad. This aircraft was previously operated by BWIA West Indies Airways.
 N910TE L-1011-1 on display with Tristar Experience at Kansas City International Airport. It was previously in storage in Tucson after being retired by the Flying Hospital group as P4-MED in favor of an MD-10. N910TE is the only L-1011-1 with operating RB211-22b engines, and is the only L-1011 other than StarGazer maintained in airworthy condition.
 HS-AXE (Thai Sky Airlines), formerly N718DA (Delta) L-1011-1 was converted to a bar/restaurant located in Bangkok, Thailand.
 9Q-CHC (Hewa Bora Airways), MSN 1209 formerly C-GAGI (Air Canada) and N767DA (Delta) L-1011-385-3 Tristar 500 moved to Parc de la Vallée de la Nsele near Kinshasa, Democratic Republic of the Congo where it will be converted to a bar/restaurant.
 CS-TMP (Luzair) MSN 1248 formerly JY-AGJ (Royal Jordanian) L-1011-385-3 Tristar 500 moved to Underwater Military Museum Dive Site, Aqaba, Jordan on 26 August 2019 for use as a tourist dive site.
 N102CK (Gee Bee Airways), MSN 1198, in Kitty Hawk basic colours, formerly G-BHBM (British Airways) L-1011 Tristar 200F, stored at the apron of Kavala Airport LGKV/KVA - Greece, since November 2004. 
N388LS, the former Las Vegas Sands L-1011-500, was damaged beyond repair in 2013 by floods while it was parked at Bangkok Airport. In 2018, the aircraft's body was disassembled and reassembled for display at Chic Chic Market, Nong Khai.

Specifications

Deliveries

Popular culture

 The band El Ten Eleven, a Los Angeles post-rock duo, derives its name from the L-1011.

See also

References
Notes

Citations

Further reading

External links

 
 
 
 
 
 
 

L-1011
1970s United States airliners
Trijets
Low-wing aircraft
Lockheed bribery scandals
Aircraft first flown in 1970
Wide-body aircraft